Hitesh Sharma may refer to:
 Tesher, the Canadian-Indian rapper
Hitesh Sharma (footballer)
Hitesh Sharma (cricketer)